Halsall is a toponymic surname of English origin, derived from the village of Halsall in Lancashire.

Notable people with this surname include:

Alan Halsall (born 1982), English actor
Albert Halsall (1942–2011), English rugby league footballer
Billy Halsall (1897–1968), English footballer
Cuthbert Halsall (died 1619), English politician
Dano Halsall (born 1963), Swiss swimmer
Eric Halsall (1920–1996), English countryman, author and television presenter
Francesca Halsall (born 1990), British swimmer
Guy Halsall (born 1964), historian
Hector Halsall (born 1900), English rugby league footballer
Martin Halsall (born 1984), English rugby union player
Matthew Halsall, jazz musician
Mick Halsall (born 1961), English footballer
Norman Halsall (born 1935), English cricketer
Richard Halsall (born 1968), Zimbabwean cricketer
Ollie Halsall (1949–1992), British guitarist
Penny Halsall or Penny Jordan (1946–2011), English writer
Peter Halsall (born 1958), Australian rules footballer
Wally Halsall (1912–1996), English footballer
William Halsall (born 1841), American painter

References

See also
 Halsell, another surname with similar spelling

English toponymic surnames